Barte is a surname. Notable people with the surname include:

Eleanore Barté (1893–1946), American writer
Hilary Barte (born 1988), American tennis player

See also
Bartee
Barter (surname)